JBS S.A. is a Brazilian company that is the largest meat processing company (by sales) in the world, producing factory processed beef, chicken and pork, and also selling by-products from the processing of these meats. It is headquartered in São Paulo. It was founded in 1953 in Anápolis, Goiás.

As of 2017, the company had 150 industrial plants around the world. J&F Investimentos is a 42% indirect shareholder in JBS S.A., which is listed on American stock markets as JBSAY. J&F Investimentos is wholly owned by Joesley Batista and Wesley Batista. As of May 2017, JBS S.A. remains the world's biggest butcher. 

The company has been regularly criticised for sourcing meat from farms that contribute to the destruction of the Amazon rainforest.

History

1953–2000: Formation in Brazil
JBS was initially established as a slaughtering business by rancher José Batista Sobrinho, a rancher in Anápolis, Brazil, in 1953. (The company's name comes from the founder's initials.) Sobrinho's business began to expand when the establishment of Brazil's capital, Brasilia, brought a new market within reach of his ranch. Over the late 1960s Sobrinho expanded into owning slaughterhouses; then, in the 1980s, the company began expanding within Brazil and purchasing other meat processing companies. In subsequent years, the company has grown to become the world's largest company in the beef sector with the acquisition of several stores and food companies in Brazil and the world.

JBS became a publicly held company in 2007, and in the same year received a major investment from BNDES (Brazilian Development Bank).

2007–2010: US acquisitions

In 2007, JBS went through with a US$225m acquisition of U.S. firm Swift & Company, which was the third largest U.S. beef and pork processor, renamed as JBS USA. It leads the world in slaughter capacity, at 51.4 thousand head per day, and continues to focus on production operations, processing, and export plants, nationally and internationally. With the new acquisition, JBS entered the pork market, to end the year as the third largest producer and processor of this type of meat in the United States. The acquisition expanded the company's portfolio to include rights to the worldwide use of the Swift brand.

The next year, JBS acquired Smithfield Foods' beef business. It was renamed JBS Packerland.

On 31 August 2010 it was announced that the company had acquired 64% of Pilgrim's Pride for a bid of US$800 million, establishing JBS's position in the chicken production industry, but currently the company owns 75.3% of Pilgrim's Pride.

2010: South American operations
On September 16, 2009, JBS announced that it had acquired the food operation of Grupo Bertin, one of three Brazilian market leaders, consolidating its position as the largest beef producer in the world. The banks JP Morgan Chase and Santander Brasil assisted in the transaction.

In August 2010, it was reported that JBS was considering to sell some of the eight slaughterhouses it owned in Argentina because of "scarce livestock and export restrictions". Between 2007 and 2010, JBS received around $2.5 billion in investments from BNDES.

2011-2016: Expansion, CanaMex acquisitions
As of 2011, JBS had been trying to bid to gain control of Sara Lee Corporation's meat business. JBS had shown interest in the meats business but struggled to push forward with a bid for the entire company.

On 9 January 2013, JBS USA acquired the Canadian operations of XL Foods, chiefly the XL Lakeside beef processing plant in Brooks, Alberta which had at the time the capacity to process 4,000 head of cattle per day.

On May 27, 2014, Pilgrim's Pride Corporation, 75% owned by JBS S.A., made an unsolicited $5.6 billion bid for Hillshire Brands Co. (HSH).

On July 28, 2014, Tyson Foods, Inc. announced its intention to sell Tyson de México and Tyson do Brasil, its Mexican and Brazilian poultry subsidiaries, to JBS S.A. for $575 million in cash by the end of 2014, pending regulatory approval.

In 2015, JBS bought the US pork business of Cargill Inc. for $1.45 billion.

Also in 2015, JBS S.A. created a board of compliance directors in Brazil.

2016: IPO of US unit
In December 2016, JBS announced a re-organization plan, which involved an initial public offering (IPO) in the United States for its international operations, through JBS Foods International. At the time, it had units on five continents.

2017: Brazilian food market drop
According to industry estimates, as of 2017, JBS USA was the second-largest processor of beef and pork in the United States, while JBS-owned Pilgrim's was the second-largest poultry company.

By February 2017, JBS had been accused of wrongdoing in a wider investigation into compliance issues in Brazil, although it planned to increase its board of compliance directors from three people to eight. At the time, the company's controlling shareholder J&F Investimentos SA was being investigated "in relation to fraud at state-run companies’ employee pension funds". The investigation looked into whether JBS possibly benefited from the scheme, including JBS chairman Joesley Batista, who denied wrongdoing.  By March 2017, JBS SA remained the world's largest supplier of animal protein, after a series of acquisitions in part funded by loans from banks controlled by the Brazilian government. Global operations included brands Seara, Swift, and Moy Park. In March 2017, JBS was accused by Brazil's environmental regulator of buying cattle raised on illegally deforested Amazon land, with JBS denying wrongdoing.

On March 17, 2017, it was announced that Brazil was investigating its meat-packing industry for "allegedly bribing food-sanitation inspectors", with JBS SA among the dozens of firms targeted, in particular a single employee. JBS shares dropped 10 percent with the announcement. JBS denied any wrongdoing and said it had taken “applicable measures” against the one employee included in the investigation, due to his alleged relationships with government inspectors. The announcement of the police allegations led to various nations considering banning Brazilian beef imports. China, 20 other countries, and the European Union subsequently issued temporary bans on Brazilian meat shipments, or increased scrutiny. On March 23, 2017, JBS SA said it had slashed beef production, halting beef production in 33 of its 36 plants for three days, with a plan to cut production by 35% of capacity at all its units. JBS stated the "measures aim at adjusting production until there is a decision about the embargoes imposed by importers." The company also spent more on advertising.  After initial trade disruptions, Brazilian meat companies regained access to most international markets.

2017: BNDES and bribery investigations
On May 12, 2017, authorities announced that they were investigating whether JBS SA had received illegal financing advantages from state-owned bank BNDES. Dubbed "Operation Bullish", police stated that these had led to a loss of around $385 million in public funds. JBS said the financing was lawful, and BNDES said it was cooperating with authorities. Executives including CEO Wesley Batista and chairman Joesley Batista were questioned by federal police. The court forbade the Batistas from restructuring the business during the investigation. On May 16, 2017, JBS said it might delay its planned IPO due to legal troubles. The CEO made it clear, however, that the IPO was not canceled.

On May 17, O Globo reported that it had obtained a recording of Michel Temer encouraging JBS chairman Joesley Batista to "bribe a jailed former legislator to buy the lawmaker’s silence." The news resulted in protests and calls for Temer's resignation, and the Brazilian stock market dropped. Temer denied wrongdoing. On May 17, 2017 O Globo reported that Joesley Batista, through J&F Investimentos, allegedly paid bribes to three presidents. Documentation of the payments was released by the Supreme Court on May 19. On May 19, 2017, Joesley Batista admitted to paying bribes to Michel Temer, Dilma Rousseff and Luiz Inácio Lula da Silva, over the previous 14 years. Joesley Batista told prosecutors J&F Investimentos had paid a total of $123 million in bribes to Brazilian politicians in recent years. All three presidents denied accepting bribes. Temer alleged Batista had doctored evidence, including a recording of Temer talking to Batista, to make money from the scandal through insider trading. Batista denied illegal share purchases. As of May 22, the Comissão de Valores Mobiliários (CVM) was demanding $3.4 billion from J&F Investimentos as part of a promised plea deal, according to the press. The former head of CVM referred to testimony that asserted J&F Investimentos had bribed 1,829 politicians. In May 2017 JBS retained law firm Baker McKenzie to negotiate possible criminal charges with the United States Department of Justice under the Foreign Corrupt Practices Act.

Reports May 31, 2017 said J&F Investimentos had agreed to pay US$3.2 billion in fines, for leniency from the Brazilian government "over 25 years after admitting to giving roughly $150 million—mostly in bribes—to Brazilian politicians." JBS shares afterwards rose 9% on São Paulo's stock exchange. In exchange for their cooperation, the chairman and his older brother avoided jail time. All three former presidents continued to deny accepting bribes from Joesley Batista.

2017: Recruitment of safety director, Mexican divestment
In early August 2017, JBS hired Alfred Almanza as its global head of food safety. Almanza had previously been the head of food safety at the U.S. Department of Agriculture.

On August 3, 2017, it was reported that JBS was selling its stake in its Mexican unit of Vigor Alimentos to Grupo Lala.

2018: United States Department of Agriculture bailout
JBS, a Brazilian-owned company, received $22.3 million from the USDA farm bailout package of 2018.

COVID-19 pandemic
At least 277 JBS USA workers at a plant in Greeley, Colorado, were presumed to be infected with coronavirus disease 2019 in April 2020, leading to the closure of this large meat processing operation with over 3,000 employees; the plant reopened after a 9-day closure. The Weld County, Colorado Department of Public Health, where Greeley is located, reported that employees had said that the JBS plant had a "work while sick" culture. The company denied any such pressure on workers. By April 15, 102 workers had tested positive for the coronavirus, and four had died. Outbreaks of COVID-19 have also been found in five other JBS beef processing plants, in Souderton, Pennsylvania; Plainwell, Michigan; Green Bay, Wisconsin; Cactus, Texas; and Grand Island, Nebraska.

With 600 workers confirmed and probable cases in the JBS Foods plant in Brooks, Alberta, 7% of the population tested positive for COVID-19. As of May 9, 510 workers had recovered, but one worker died. On 22 April it came to light that even though the plant had added a shift premium of $4 an hour, many employees skipped their shifts forcing the company to reduce their schedule to one shift. As of April 21, the company claimed that there had been no walk-offs.

Cyberattack
JBS was targeted by a cyberattack in late May 2021, which forced the company to temporarily shut down slaughterhouses in Australia, Canada and the United States. The company stood down 7,000 workers across Australian operations and up to 3,000 workers in Canada and the United States. In June 2021, JBS paid $11 million in ransom, using Bitcoin, to put an end to the cyberattack. Chief executive Andre Nogueira said: "This was a very difficult decision to make for our company and for me personally".

Cultured meat
In 2021, JBS invested US$ 100 million in cultured meat through BioTech Foods, with plans to release to the market by 2024.

Plants and subsidiaries
JBS's production structure is embedded in consumer markets worldwide, with plants installed in the world's four leading beef producing nations (Brazil, Argentina, United States, and Australia), serving 110 countries through exports.

Environmental Impact 
JBS released 421.6 million metric tonnes of carbon in 2021, which is a larger output than all of Italy. In a five-year period, JBS's emissions increased by 50%.

In December 2022, Brazilian federal prosecutors released a report showing that "Nearly 17% of the cattle bought by JBS SA in Brazil's Para state in the Amazon rainforest allegedly came from ranches with "irregularities" such as illegal deforestation", according to Reuters.

Board of directors
As of April 30, 2019, board members include:
 Jeremiah O'Callaghan (chair) 
 José Batista Sobrinho
 Aguinaldo Gomes Ramos Filho
 Gilberto Meirelles Xandó Baptista
 Wesley Mendonça Batista Filho
 José Guimarães Monforte
 Cledorvino Belini
 Alba Pettengill
 Márcio Guedes Pereira Júnior

See also 
 JBS Foods International
 JBS USA 
 BNDES
 List of scandals in Brazil
 Michel Temer
 Operation Car Wash
 Impact of the COVID-19 pandemic on the meat industry in the United States

References

External links

 
Meat companies of Brazil
Brand name poultry meats
Companies based in São Paulo
Companies listed on B3 (stock exchange)
Food recalls
Brazilian brands
Food and drink companies established in 1953
1953 establishments in Brazil
Batista family
Poultry companies
Meat packers